Mugwumps were a group of Republican activists who supported Democratic candidate Grover Cleveland in the United States presidential election of 1884.

Mugwump or Mugwumps may also refer to:

 Mugwump (video game), an early computer game written in BASIC
 The Mugwumps (band), a 1960s rock band
 Mugwump (folklore), a lake monster purported to live in Lake Timiskaming, Canada
 "Mugwump", a 1996 song by Terrorvision from Regular Urban Survivors
 Mugwumps, creatures from the William S. Burroughs novel Naked Lunch and its film adaptation
 Supreme Mugwump, the title for the head of the International Confederation of Wizards in J.K. Rowling's Harry Potter series